JDSF may stand for:
 Jackson Demonstration State Forest, a forest in California, US
 , member of the World DanceSport Federation
 JD Sports Fashion, British retail company
 John Dau Sudan Federation, non-profit organization in Sudan

See also 
 Japan Self-Defense Forces